91:an (Eng: № 91) is a popular bi-weekly Swedish comic book published by Egmont Kärnan AB. First brought out in 1956, it primarily publishes comic strips by Swedish cartoonists.

Although it is read by some younger children it is mainly aimed at teenagers and adults, with 72% of its current readership aged 20 or over. Total readership is approximately 278,000.

The current editor is Karin Wahlund Franck.

Featured comic strips
The principal cartoon strip is 91:an, whose principal character, Mandel Karlsson, is a young man (aged perhaps 20 or 21) doing conscribed military service in the Swedish Army. His number is "91", thus he is widely known in Sweden as "91:an Karlsson", although in the modern comic strip itself he is almost always referred to as Mandel (Eng: Almond, an extremely unusual first name), or simply  as "91:an".

From the very first edition two other strips have featured in every edition: Åsa-Nisse (which has also had its own comic book, periodically, since 1960) and Kronblom.

Historic line up
Other strips which have had runs in the comic are:
Acke (the American strip Archie)
Adamson (a Swedish strip which went on to great success in the United States, and worldwide, renamed as Silent Sam and Adamson's Adventures)
Agust
Biffen och Bananen
Flygsoldat 113 Bom
Frisk och Rask
Geniet
Herr Larsson
Historiska historier
Jönsson-Ligan
Knallhatten (the American strip Li'l Abner)
Lilla Fridolf (now has its own comic book)
Livet hemmavid
Olle Bull (the American strip Oaky Doaks)
Sputnik
Svenne Gurka
Tuffa Viktor (the English strip Andy Capp)
Uti vår hage (now has its own comic book)
Vimmelgrind
Vi å pappa (now published as an Annual)
Vår lilla stad

Current line up
91:an
Åsa-Nisse
Kronblom
Livet hemmavid
Ferguson (every second issue)
Lilla Fridolf (occasional)
Flygsoldat 113 Bom (occasional)

91:an mot väggen 
One of the key features of the comic is a remarkable readers' letters section, covering 2 pages, called 91:an mot väggen or Ställ 91:an mot väggen (Eng: Put No. 91 up against the wall). Here, one of the longest serving writers, Leif Bergendorff, replies to letters in an open and informative manner.

See also
91:an (comic strip)
Mandel Karlsson
91 Stomperud, a Norwegian comic character initially based on the Swedish character

References 
  (Åhlén & Åkerlunds)
  (Semic)
  (Egmont)

1956 comics debuts
1956 establishments in Sweden
Biweekly magazines published in Sweden
Comics magazines published in Sweden
Magazines established in 1956
Magazines about comics
Swedish-language magazines
Teen magazines